Cicerinidae is a family of flatworms belonging to the order Rhabdocoela.

Genera

Genera:
 Acirrostylus Van Steenkiste, Volonterio, Schockaert & Artois, 2008
 Acrumena Brunet, 1965
 Cicerina Giard, 1904

References

Platyhelminthes